Stugsunds IK is a Swedish football club located in Söderhamn.

Background
Stugsunds IK currently plays in Division 4 Hälsingland which is the sixth tier of Swedish football. They play their home matches at the Stuvarvallen in Söderhamn.

The club is affiliated to Hälsinglands Fotbollförbund.

Season to season

In their most successful period Stugsunds IK competed in the following divisions:

In recent seasons Stugsunds IK have competed in the following divisions:

Footnotes

External links
 Stugsunds IK – Official website

Football clubs in Gävleborg County